Copper City may refer to a location in the United States:

 Copper City, California (disambiguation)
Copper City, Glenn County, California
Copper City, San Bernardino County, California
 Copper City, Michigan